Elisabetta Artuso (born 25 April 1974) is a former Italian middle distance runner who won eight national titles at senior level.

Biography
Artuso has been able to win eight Italian titles with a distance of 13 years from the first to the last title.

Achievements

National titles
Italian Athletics Championships
800 m: 2001, 2004, 2011
Italian Athletics Indoor Championships
800 m: 1998, 2002, 2003, 2005, 2011

References

External links
 

1974 births
Living people
Italian female middle-distance runners
Athletics competitors of Gruppo Sportivo Forestale
20th-century Italian women
21st-century Italian women